Jimmy Picker is an American stop-motion claymation filmmaker, screenwriter, producer, and director. He was claymation director for The Electric Company from 1976 to 1977 and produced several short movies and two longer films. He contributed the animated sequence to Savage Steve Holland's Better Off Dead.

Selected filmography

 Jimmy the C (1977)
 Sundae in New York (1984)
 Μy Friend Liberty (1986)
 The Age of Ignorance (2003)

External links

Living people
Year of birth missing (living people)